The Clifton F. McClintic Wildlife Management Area, known locally as "the TNT area", is a naturalized area located in Mason County about  north of Point Pleasant, West Virginia. The area still contains stored explosives.

In the late 1960s, the area was the location of supposed sightings of a paranormal Mothman creature.

Hunting and fishing

Hunting opportunities include deer, mourning dove, grouse, rabbit, raccoon, squirrel, waterfowl, woodcock, and turkey. Special regulations for deer hunting have been established for the WMA to create a "trophy buck hunting" area.

Trapping opportunities include beaver, mink, muskrat, and raccoon.  A special permit from the District Wildlife Biologist is required to run traps on WMA land.

Fishing opportunities abound in the 29 ponds available for fishing and in the nearby Ohio River.  Warmwater species fishing opportunities can include walleye, musky, tiger musky, channel catfish, hybrid striped bass, saugeye, sunfish, largemouth bass, and smallmouth bass.

Rustic camping is available seasonally in the WMA.  A  shooting range is also available.

See also
Animal conservation
Camping
Fishing
Hunting
Mothman
List of West Virginia wildlife management areas
West Virginia Ordnance Works

References

External links
West Virginia DNR District 5 Wildlife Management Areas
West Virginia Hunting Regulations
West Virginia Fishing Regulations

Campgrounds in West Virginia
Protected areas of Mason County, West Virginia
Wildlife management areas of West Virginia
Point Pleasant micropolitan area
IUCN Category V